Maximilian Krauß (born 24 November 1996) is a German footballer who plays as a winger for Carl Zeiss Jena.

References

External links
 Profile at DFB.de
 Profile at kicker.de

1996 births
Living people
German footballers
People from Hof (district)
Sportspeople from Upper Franconia
Footballers from Bavaria
Association football wingers
SpVgg Bayern Hof players
1. FC Nürnberg II players
SpVgg Unterhaching players
FC Carl Zeiss Jena players
3. Liga players
Regionalliga players
Oberliga (football) players